Pinesville is a hamlet in Delaware County, New York. It is located west-southwest of Walton at the corner of NY–10 and Pines Brook Road. Pines Brook converges with the West Branch Delaware River south of Pinesville. The West Branch Delaware River flows west, south of the hamlet.

References

Geography of Delaware County, New York
Hamlets in Delaware County, New York
Hamlets in New York (state)